Wheelchair DanceSport is a dance competition, individual, partner, team and Dancesport where at least one of the dancers is in a wheelchair.

Sport 
Wheelchair couple dances are for two wheelchair users or for one wheelchair user with a "standing" partner and include standard dances such as waltz, tango, Viennese waltz, slow foxtrot and quickstep and Latin American dances such as samba, cha-cha-cha, rumba, paso doble and jive. There are also formation dances for four, six or eight dancers.

Wheelchair dancing started in Sweden in 1968, originally for recreation or rehabilitation, with the first competition held in 1975. The first international competition was also held in Sweden, in 1977. Several regional and international competitions followed and the first World Championship was held in Japan in 1998. Since 1998, Wheelchair Dance Sport is governed by the International Paralympic Wheelchair Dance Sport Committee (IPWDSC), although it is a part of the paralympic program. The sport corporates the rules of the World DanceSport Federation (WDSF).

Classification 
 Combi: dancing with an able-bodied (standing) partner
 Duo: dance for two wheelchair users together
 Formation: dances for four, six or eight couples dancing in formation

Athletes are placed into one of two classes:
 LWD 1: 14 points or less
 LWD 2: more than 14 points

World Para DanceSport Championships

European Para DanceSport Championships

Asian Para DanceSport Championships

Social 
Wheelchair dancing is a popular social and recreational activity, with participants in over 40 countries. The physical benefits of wheelchair dancing include the maintenance of physical balance, flexibility, range of motion, coordination and improved respiratory control. The psychological effects of ballroom dancing are social interaction and the development of relationships. For social dancers, it is an opportunity to engage in a fun and a friendly event with others. For competitors, it assists in the development of fair play, sportsmanship and communication skills. Wheelchair dancing is an activity that integrates the wheelchair user and able-bodied person.

Courses 
In February, 2008 the University of Delaware Collegiate DanceWheels Program was created to instruct students in wheelchair dancing. This is the first accredited course of its kind in the United States. The program was developed in conjunction with the American DanceWheels Foundation through a grant from the Christopher and Dana Reeve Foundation.

See also 

 Physically integrated dance
 Dancing on Wheels (a British television show)
 Piotr Iwanicki
 Brian Fortuna

References

External links 

  IPC- Wheelchair Dancesport
 https://www.paralympic.org/dance-sport/results

Dance
Parasports organizations
Dancesport
Social dance
Physically integrated dance